Reine Enchanteur ( 1967) was a Thoroughbred racehorse out of Sea Bird who was sold for a world-record $405,000 ($ million inflation adjusted) in 1968.

She earned a total career purse of $9,305. Owner Wendell P. Rosso used her for breeding, including with 1971 Blue Grass Stakes winner Impetuosity.

References

1967 racehorse births
Racehorses bred in Kentucky
Racehorses trained in the United States
Thoroughbred family 4-c